The Texas Charge were a women's professional softball team based in San Marcos, Texas. The team began play as the Dallas Charge as a member of National Pro Fastpitch (NPF) with a game on June 3, 2015. They were initially headquartered in the Dallas–Fort Worth, Texas area, with most home games at The Ballfields at Craig Ranch.

Seasons
Inaugural season

When the Dallas team was publicly announced, NPF also revealed its general manager would be Kevin Shelton, who had experience heading the Texas Glory youth program. The Charge hired former Olympian Jennifer McFalls to be their first head coach. Later, Chez Sievers was added as an assistant coach.

Jolene Henderson signed with the Charge in January 2015, becoming their first player. Other transactions included signing former Texas Longhorns shortstop Taylor Thom, and the Charge trading their fourth round pick in the 2016 NPF Draft to the Chicago Bandits for catcher Kaylyn Castillo. Later, infielder Natalie Villarreal became the first player from the Dallas area to join the Charge. Then, the Charge signed pitcher Morgan Melloh, who had played the previous three years in the Japan Softball League after spending 2011 and 2012 in the NPF. The club then added five-year veteran Angeline Quiocho. Texas Tech's all-time home run leader, outfielder Mikey Kenney, and  pitcher Bailey Watts were next to join. Texas native and catcher Molly Fichtner, and pitcher Sarah Purvis of Georgia Southern were the next additions to the Charge.

Dallas' next signings were international ones. Australian National Team pitcher Vanessa Stokes signed with the Charge. She is the first indigenous softball player ever to pitch for Australia, and the first Australian to sign with the NPF. Next, the Charge set their sights on Japan. Olympic gold medalist outfielder Eri Yamada, and the Japan League's 2013 and 2014 Catcher of the Year Kazuki Watanabe joined the Charge. Both played with the Chicago Bandits in 2013.

On the domestic front, Dallas next added Texas native and Texas A&M Aggie infielder/catcher Nicole Morgan. Morgan played for the Pennsylvania Rebellion in 2014. After attending a try out in May 2015, outfielder Brianna Cherry was offered a deal with the team. Cherry was with the Akron Racers in 2014. Kathy Shelton, formerly of Baylor and general manager Kevin Shelton's daughter, was next to sign.

At the 2015 NPF Draft, the Charge drafted several players. In the first round, they selected 3B/C Danielle Henderson (California). She is Jolene's sister. The club then selected utility player Kaitlyn Richardson (Minnesota). In the second round, their only pick was INF/OF Kylee Lahners (Washington). The third round selection was infielder Ashley Burkhardt (Purdue). Dallas was allowed a market pick to select a player from Dallas or who went to a Dallas school. This selection was shortstop Renada Davis (NC State). Round four yielded two picks: SS/2B Kahley Novak (UCF) and RHP/1B Lauren Haeger (Florida). Selected in the fifth round was OF Janie Takeda (Oregon). The sixth and final round had three Dallas picks: RHP/UT Ally Carda (UCLA), OF Kaitlyn Thumann (Baylor), and pitcher Farish Beard (South Alabama). Before opening day, the Charge signed draftees Ashley Burkhardt, Kahley Novak, Kaitlyn Richardson, Danielle Henderson, and Renada Davis. Other free agents who signed with the Charge included Renee Erwin of West Texas A&M, Nadia Taylor of Texas and Akron Racers, and Victoria Valos of George Washington.

The Charge finished their inaugural season in fourth place at 17-31. The Charge then lost in the 2015 NPF Championship semifinals to the USSSA Pride.

2016 season

For the 2016 season, Jennifer Rocha was named head coach succeeding Jennifer McFalls. They ultimately finished in fifth place and missed the playoffs.

2017 season

The Charge moved to San Marcos for the 2017 season and hired three-time Olympian Crystl Bustos to be their head coach.  In July, with a 10-11 record, the Charge replaced Crystl Bustos with Roman Foore as head coach.  For the second year in a row, they finished in fifth place and missed the playoffs.

In a January 2018 release describing the termination of the Scrap Yard Dawgs' franchise, NPF also indicated that the Charge had been "dismantled after [owner Joel] Bartsch failed to execute an exclusive purchasing option." This was the first official statement by the league about the status of the Charge after the league listed all Charge players as free agents and Justin's World of Softball reported the dissolution of the team in October 2017.

General managers
 Kevin Shelton (2015-2016)
 Scott Smith (2016, 2017)

All-time head coaches

Season-by-season 

|-
|align=center|2015 || 17 || 31 || 0 || 4th place National Pro Fastpitch || Lost in NPF Semifinals 
|-
|align=center|2016 || 20 || 30 || 0 || 5th place National Pro Fastpitch || Did Not Qualify
|-
|align=center|2017 || 22 || 28 || 0 || 5th place National Pro Fastpitch || Did Not Qualify
|-
!Totals || 59|| 89 || 0
|colspan="2"|

Final roster before dissolution

References

External links 
 
 

Softball in Texas
National Pro Fastpitch teams
Sports in the Dallas–Fort Worth metroplex
2015 establishments in Texas
Sports clubs established in 2015
Sports clubs disestablished in 2017
Defunct softball teams in the United States
Defunct National Pro Fastpitch teams
Defunct sports teams in Texas
2017 disestablishments in Texas
San Marcos, Texas
Collin County, Texas
Women's sports in Texas